Alexander Sabo (February 14, 1910 – January 3, 2001) was a Major League Baseball catcher who played for the Washington Senators in  and .  Sabo played college football and college baseball at Fordham University.  He was later an assistant football coach at Rutgers University

References

External links

1910 births
2001 deaths
Major League Baseball catchers
Fordham Rams baseball players
Fordham Rams football players
Rutgers Scarlet Knights football coaches
Washington Senators (1901–1960) players
Sportspeople from New Brunswick, New Jersey
Baseball players from New Jersey